Football club Kupiškis, commonly known as Kupiškis was a Lithuanian football team from Kupiškis.

History
The club was formed in 2018, and made headlines when it was granted exception to participate straight away in the 2nd tier league even after failing the licensing process.

The club was struggling, but it made headlines again by trashing FK Koralas Klaipėda 12:0. The game was dubbed a circus, and flagged for match fixing. While investigation was taking place, another game was flagged, against FK Panevėžys. As a result of the investigation, five players were suspended.  The team finished the season in 13th position, only above dissolved club FK Koralas Klaipėda.

Despite match fixing and relegation-bound position in 2018, the club was again granted exception to play in 2019 LFF I Lyga. The club struggled again, and finished the season 10th. After the end of the season, another match fixing scandal was under investigation. Six FC Kupiškis players were suspended and fined. This time the club was fined, and disqualified from the I Lyga. The club will be allowed to participate in II Lyga in 2020.

Results

Squad (2019)
3 October 2019

|-----
! colspan="9" bgcolor="#B0D3FB" align="left" |
|----- bgcolor="#DFEDFD"

|-----
! colspan="9" bgcolor="#B0D3FB" align="left" |
|----- bgcolor="#DFEDFD"

|-----
! colspan="9" bgcolor="#B0D3FB" align="left" |
|----- bgcolor="#DFEDFD"

Managers
  Leonardo Iparraguire, (2018 season)
  Eduards Štrubo, (2019)

Former players 
See Category:FC Kupiškis players

References

External links
 lietuvosfutbolas.lt

Football clubs in Lithuania
2017 establishments in Lithuania
Association football clubs established in 2017